Oumar Toure may refer to:
 Oumar Toure (swimmer)
 Oumar Toure (footballer)